Homewood is a stone house located off of Homewood road in Ellicott City in Howard County, Maryland.

Homewood was built on the Carroll family's Doughoregan Manor for Robert Goodloe Harper Carroll (1839-1915), who served in Company K of the Confederate 1st Virginia Cavalry. He served with his younger brother Albert, who died in battle. The family home was passed on to R. G. Harper Carroll II, then to the Wright Family. The house stayed in the Carroll family until the 1960s before it went through a series of owners including a Rouse Company executive and the administrator of Howard County General Hospital. In 1996 Joan Cochran, wife of former county Executive Edward L. Cochran, listed the 14-acre property for sale for $1.4 million.

Homewood has six fireplaces, library, wine cellar and grand foyer. The house offers six bedrooms and a gourmet kitchen.

The Homewood Center for disruptive and emotionally disturbed youths was built near the site in 2002, and given the name Homewood Alternative Learning Center to sound "elegant".

See also
Doughoregan Manor
Homewood Museum - Carroll Estate in Baltimore County
Edgewood Farm, "Gaither Farm", "Homewood Farm".

References

Houses in Howard County, Maryland
Buildings and structures in Ellicott City, Maryland
Houses completed in 1830
1830 establishments in Maryland